The Dias Cross Memorial is a  provincial heritage site at Kwaaihoek, Alexandria in the Eastern Cape province of South Africa.

In 1945 it was described in the Government Gazette as:

The remains of the original cross erected by Bartolomeu Dias are located at the University of the Witwatersrand in Johannesburg.

References

.

Monuments and memorials in South Africa
Buildings and structures in the Eastern Cape